German submarine U-864 was a Type IXD2 U-boat of Nazi Germany's Kriegsmarine in World War II. On 9 February 1945, it became the only submarine in history to be sunk by an enemy submarine while both were submerged. U-864 was sunk by the British submarine , and all 73 men on board died.

Design
German Type IXD2 submarines were considerably larger than the original Type IXs. U-864 had a displacement of  when at the surface and  while submerged. She had two shafts and two  propellers.

U-864 was fitted with six  torpedo tubes (four fitted at the bow and two at the stern), 24 torpedoes, one  SK C/32 naval gun, 150 rounds, and a  Flak M42 with 2575 rounds as well as two  C/30 anti-aircraft guns with 8100 rounds. The boat had a complement of fifty-five.

Service history

Early career
Commanded throughout her entire career by Korvettenkapitän Ralf-Reimar Wolfram, she served with the 4th U-boat Flotilla undergoing crew training from her commissioning until 31 October 1944. She was then reassigned to the 33rd U-boat Flotilla.

Final voyage
According to decrypted intercepts of German naval communications with Japan, U-864s mission was to transport military equipment to Japan destined for the Japanese military industry, a mission code-named Operation Caesar. That the mercury was contained in steel canisters was confirmed when one of the canisters containing mercury was located and brought to the surface during surveys of her wreck in 2005. Approximately  of mercury was purchased by the Japanese from Italy between 1942 and Italy's surrender in September 1943. This had the highest priority for submarine shipment to Japan and was used in the manufacture of explosives, especially primers.

During the Norwegian Coastal Administration's investigation of the wreck of U-864 in 2005, radiation measurements were made but no traces of uranium oxide were found.

According to her cargo list, U-864 also carried parts and engineering drawings for German jet fighter aircraft and other military supplies for Japan, while among her passengers were Messerschmitt engineers Rolf von Chlingensperg and Riclef Schomerus, Japanese torpedo expert Tadao Yamoto, and Japanese fuel expert Toshio Nakai.

The U-864, commanded by Wolfram, left Kiel on 5 December 1944, arriving at Horten Naval Base, Norway four days later. Before leaving Germany, U-864 had been refitted with a snorkel mast. Several messages found in the Ultra archives show that there were problems with the snorkel, which needed repairs before the U-864 put to sea for her voyage to Japan. All Schnorkel trials and training were conducted at Horten near Oslo. U-864 would have needed to be certified ready to sail at Horten before proceeding to Bergen.

While en route to Bergen, U-864 ran aground and had to stop in Farsund for repairs, not arriving in Bergen until 5 January 1945. While docked in the Bruno U-boat pens, U-864 received minor damage on 12 January when the pens and shipping in the harbour were attacked by 32 Royal Air Force Lancaster bombers and one Mosquito bomber of 9 and 617 Squadrons. At least one Tallboy bomb penetrated the roof of the bunker causing severe damage inside, and left one of the seven pens unusable for the remainder of the war.

Sinking

After repairs and adjustments to her snorkel were completed U-864 commenced submerged trials but German radio transmissions regarding her whereabouts had been decrypted and British submarine  was sent from the British submarine base at Lerwick to intercept.

On 6 February, U-864 passed the Fedje area without being detected but after one of her engines began to misfire, she was ordered to return to Bergen where an escort would be provided at Hellisøy.  On 9 February, Venturer detected U-864s diesel engine noise using her hydrophone as she was refraining from using active sonar (ASDIC) to avoid disclosing her position and later spotted the U-boat's snorkel.

In a long engagement and in a situation for which neither crew had been trained, Venturer waited 45 minutes after making contact before going to action stations. Recognising they were being followed and that their escort had still not arrived, U-864 began zig-zagging. After three hours, Venturer fired all four bow torpedo tubes at the U-boat's predicted position, beginning at 12:12, at 17-second intervals and at variable depths, then dived deeper to avoid retaliation. U-864 heard the torpedoes coming and also dived deeper and turned away.

Rediscovery

The mercury had been seeping out of rusted containers, contaminating the region and sea life. One study recommended entombing the wreck under a layer of sand as well as gravel and concrete. The Norwegian government instead awarded a contract to a salvage company to raise the wreck; however, the proposed operation was put on hold pending additional studies.

It was the Royal Norwegian Navy minesweeper KNM Tyr, alerted by local fishermen, that found the wreck. An expedition to gather more detail by sonar mapping of the seafloor was mounted in October 2003. The wreck was in two major sections, fore and aft, with the center section missing, including the conning tower. Further analysis was performed with a remotely operated underwater vehicle in August 2005, locating an additional 107 pieces of vessel debris in the area, likely parts of the exploded center section. The mercury, contained in 1,857 rusting steel bottles located down in the vessel's keel, was found to be leaking out and poses a severe environmental threat of mercury poisoning.

Boating and fishing near the wreck has been prohibited. Although attempts using robotic vehicles to dig into the half-buried keel were abandoned after the unstable wreck shifted, one of the steel bottles was recovered.

The delicate condition of the 2,400-ton wreck, the rusting mercury bottles, and the live torpedoes on board would make a lifting operation extremely dangerous, with significant potential for an environmental catastrophe. A three-year study by the Norwegian Coastal Administration has recommended entombing the wreck in a  thickness of sand, with a reinforcing layer of gravel or concrete to prevent erosion. This is being proposed as a permanent solution to the problem, and the proposal notes that similar techniques have been successfully used around 30 times to contain mercury-contaminated sites over the past 20 years.

Environmental protection
The fragmented wreck contains 67 tonnes of toxic liquid mercury.

The proposal to entomb the wreck rather than removing it was criticised by locals concerned about possible future leakage.

On 11 November 2008, the Norwegian Coastal Administration awarded the contract for the possible salvage of the U-864 submarine and her cargo of mercury to salvage company Mammoet Salvage BV. Mammoet, which was awarded the contract for the salvage of the Russian nuclear submarine Kursk in 2001, had proposed a method of raising U-864s wreck which would satisfy the environmental requirements, described as "a safe and innovative salvage solution". This was reported to be a safe, fully remotely controlled operation which would raise the submarine and remove the source of pollution without the need for anyone working under water. On 29 January 2009, the Norwegian government approved the proposed method of raising the wreck, and the operation was scheduled to begin in 2010. The operation was estimated to cost 1 billion kroner (US$153 million). However, the operation was postponed after the government asked for additional studies.

In the spring of 2016, the Norwegian Coastal Administration installed a counter fill on the slope under the bow section of U-864 in order to stabilize the seabed. The operation involved laying approximately 100 000 cubic meters of sand and rock in a controlled and precise manner from a specially designed ship. The result was reduced risk of movement by unconsolidated sediments, including contaminated materials, during seaquakes.

In October 2018 the Norwegian Coastal Administration decided that the wreck of U-864 would be entombed after all by capping her in clean fill on the seabed where she lay.  Establishing that the counter fill in 2016 was a similar operation as capping, the government decided that capping could be carried out with proven technology and with minimum spreading of contaminated sediments.

See also
 Mercury pollution in the ocean

References

Bibliography

External links
 
 Roll of Remembrance

German Type IX submarines
World War II submarines of Germany
World War II shipwrecks in the North Sea
U-boats sunk by British submarines
U-boats commissioned in 1943
U-boats sunk in 1945
1943 ships
Ships lost with all hands
Maritime incidents in February 1945
Mercury pollution